is a Shinto shrine traditionally believed to have been established during the reign of Emperor Keikō (71-130) located in Atsuta-ku, Nagoya, Aichi Prefecture in Japan.   The shrine is familiarly known as Atsuta-Sama (Venerable Atsuta) or simply as Miya (the Shrine). Since ancient times, it has been especially revered, ranking with the Grand Shrine of Ise.

The  shrine complex draws over 9 million visitors annually.

History

The Kojiki explains that Atsuta Shrine was founded to house the Kusanagi no Tsurugi, a legendary sword.

According to traditional sources, Yamato Takeru died in the 43rd year of Emperor Keiko's reign (景行天皇43年, equivalent 113 AD).  The possessions of the dead prince were gathered together along with the sword Kusanagi; and his widow venerated his memory in a shrine at her home.  Sometime later, these relics and the sacred sword were moved to the current location of the Atsuta Shrine.  Nihonshoki explains that this move occurred in the 51st year of Keiko's reign, but shrine tradition also dates this event in the 1st year of Emperor Chūai's reign.

During the Northern and Southern Courts Period, because it was believed that the Kusanagi no Tsurugi was or had once been housed there, the Atsuta Shrine proved to be a significant site in the struggle between ousted Emperor Go-Daigo (Southern Court) and the new emperor, Takauji Ashikaga (Northern Court). Go-Daigo was a patron to Atsuta Masayoshi, the shrine's attendant, who subsequently fled with him to Mt. Hiei in 1336 and went on to command troops on Go-Daigo's behalf in 1337. In 1335, after rebelling against Go-Daigo, Takauji appointed a new shrine attendant. He later prayed there while advancing on the capital, mimicking the behavior of Minamoto no Yoritomo, who had done the same before founding the Kamakura shogunate.

In 1338, the Southern Court had one more chance to occupy the shrine when Kitabatake Akiie led a large army down from the Southern Court's base on Mount Ryōzen. In the first month of 1338, Akiie also prayed at the shrine. However, he was killed in battle soon after and the Ashikaga cemented their control over Atsuta Shrine.

Architecture
The shrine's buildings were maintained by donations from a number of benefactors, including well-known Sengoku period figures like Oda Nobunaga, Toyotomi Hideyoshi and the Tokugawas. For example, the Nobunaga-Bei, a 7.4 m high roofed mud wall, was donated to the shrine in 1560 by Nobunaga as a token of gratitude for his victory at the Battle of Okehazama.

In 1893, it was remodeled using the Shinmeizukuri architectural style, the same style used in the building of Ise Shrine. Before a celebration in 1935, the shrine's buildings as well as other facilities were completely rearranged and improved in order to better reflect the history and cultural significance of the shrine.

During the bombings of World War II, however, many of Atsuta Shrine's buildings were destroyed by fire. The shrine's main buildings, such as the honden, were reconstructed and completed in 1955. Following the completion of these buildings, construction of other buildings continued on the shrine grounds. In 1966 the Treasure Hall was completed in order to house the shrine's collection of objects, manuscripts and documents.

Shinto belief
This Shinto shrine is dedicated to the veneration of Atsuta-no-Ōkami. Also enshrined are the "Five Great Gods of Atsuta", all of whom are connected with the legendary narratives of the sacred sword — Amaterasu-Ōmikami, Takehaya Susanoo-no-mikoto, Yamato Takeru-no-mikoto, Miyasu-hime no-mikoto, and Take Inadane-no-mikoto.

Atsuta is the traditional repository of Kusanagi no Tsurugi, the ancient sword that is considered one of the Three Sacred Treasures of Japan. Central to the Shinto significance of Atsuta Shrine is the sacred sword which is understood to be a gift from Amaterasu Ōmikami. This unique object has represented the authority and stature of Japan's emperors since time immemorial. Kusanagi is imbued with Amaterasu's spirit.

During the reign of Emperor Sujin, duplicate copies of the Imperial regalia were made in order to safeguard the originals from theft. This fear of theft proved to be justified during the reign of Emperor Tenji when the sacred sword was stolen from Atsuta; and it was not to be returned until the reign of Emperor Tenmu. There is also the purported loss of the Kusanagi during the 1185 Battle of Dan-no-ura, where it was presumed lost at sea when the Emperor Antoku committed suicide by drowning together with remnants of the Heike. Although not seen by the general public since that time, it is said to have remained in safekeeping at the shrine up to the present day.

Treasures
The shrine's Bunkaden, or treasure hall, houses over 4,000 relics, which include 174 Important Cultural Properties and a dagger that is a designated National Treasure of Japan. Atsuta Jingu Museum preserves and displays a variety of historic material, including the koshinpō (sacred garments, furniture and utensils for use of the enshrined deities). A number of donated swords, mirrors and other objects are held by the shrine, including Bugaku masks and other material associated with ancient court dances. The Bunkaden collection ranges from ancient documents to household articles. Aichi Prefecture has designated 174 items as important cultural assets.

Festivals
Over 70 ceremonies and festivals are held annually at the shrine.

 Hatsu-Ebisu (January 5): Seeking good fortune in the new year from Ebisu, the kami of Fortune.
 Yodameshi Shinji (January 7): The projected annual rainfall for the coming year is prophesied by measuring the amount of water in a pot kept underneath the floor of the Eastern Treasure House.
 Touka Shinji (January 11): A variation on an annual ceremony (Touka-no-sechie) of the Imperial Court in the Heian period (10th-12th Century), the shrine dance becomes a prayer in movement hoping for bumper crops of the year.
 Hosha Shinji (January 15): Ceremonial which involves shooting an arrow at a wooden piece called chigi fixed at the center of a huge mark.
 Bugaku Shinji (May 1): A ceremonial dance from the Heian era is performed outdoors on a red painted stage.
 Eyoudo Shinji (May 4): A festival to commemorate the return of the sacred sword in the reign of Emperor Tenji.
 Shinyo-Togyo Shinji (May 5): A festival in which portable shrine (mikoshi) is carried in a formal procession to the Western Gate, where ceremonies and prayers for the security of the Imperial Palace are performed in the open air. In the Meiji period and Taisho period, this procession moved in sober and solemn silence. The ceremony at the gate was brief, lasting only 20 minutes; and then the mikoshi and its attendants returned into the Shrine precincts. Shōgun Ashikaga Yoshimasa provided a new mikoshi and a complete set of robes and other accouterments for this festival on the occasion of repairs to the shrine in the 1457-1459 (Chōroku 1-3).
 Rei Sai (June 5): Portable tabernacles (mikoshi) in various styles are carried along the approaches to the shrine; and at night, groups of 365 lanterns (makiwara) appear lit at the gates. This festival commemorates an Imperial proclamation (semmyō) issued in 1872 (Meiji 5). After 1906 (Meiji 39), exhibitions of judo, fencing (gekken), and archery (kyūdō) are presented for the gratification of the kami.

Auxiliary shrines 
The Atsuta Shrine has 1 betsugū, 8 sessha, and 19 massha inside the hongū, and 4 sessha and 12 massha outside hongū, 45 shrines in total (including the hongū).

Betsugū 
 Hakkengū

Sessha 
 Ichinomisaki Shrine
 Hisakimiko Shrine
 Hikowakamiko Shrine
 Minamishingūsha
 Mita Shrine
 Shimochikama Shrine
 Kamichikama Shrine
 Ryū Shrine

Sessha outside hongū 
 Takakuramusubimiko Shrine
 Hikamianego Shrine
 Aofusuma Shrine
 Matsugo Shrine

Massha 
 Yako-no-Yashira
 Tōsu-no-Yashira
 Reinomimae-sha
 others

Gallery

See also
 List of Shinto shrines
 List of Jingū
 Yaizu Shrine
 List of National Treasures of Japan (crafts-swords)

Notes

References
 Iwao, Seiichi, Teizō Iyanaga, Susumu Ishii and Shôichirô Yoshida. (2002).  Dictionnaire historique du Japon. Paris: Maisonneuve & Larose. ; OCLC 51096469
 Ponsonby-Fane, Richard Arthur Brabazon. (1962).   Studies in Shinto and Shrines. Kyoto: Ponsonby Memorial Society. OCLC 3994492

External links

  Atsuta-jingū website
  Atsuta-jingū website

Beppyo shrines
Jingū
Shinto shrines in Nagoya
National Treasures of Japan
Important Cultural Properties of Japan
Buildings and structures in Japan destroyed during World War II
Yayoi period
Religious buildings and structures completed in 1955
Kanpei-taisha